The International Journal of Medical Microbiology, formerly the Zentralblatt für Bakteriologie, is a peer-reviewed medical journal covering research on microbiology published by Elsevier. It was established in 1887 by Friedrich Loeffler. The current editor-in-chief is Sebastian Suerbaum (Max von Pettenkofer-Institut). According to the Journal Citation Reports, the journal has a 2017 impact factor of 3.298.

References

External links 
 

Microbiology journals
Elsevier academic journals
Publications established in 1887
English-language journals